Coniophanes schmidti, the  faded black-striped snake, is a species of snake in the family Colubridae. The species is native to Mexico, Belize,  and Guatemala.

References

Coniophanes
Snakes of North America
Reptiles described in 1937
Reptiles of Mexico
Reptiles of Belize
Reptiles of Guatemala